Caroline Friderike Rosenberg (1810-1902) was a Danish botanist.   She became well known during her time for her published research in Norwegian algae.

References

1810 births
1902 deaths
Danish phycologists
Women botanists
Women phycologists
19th-century Danish botanists
19th-century Danish women scientists